Apamea vulgaris (common apamea) is a moth of the family Noctuidae. It is found from Nova Scotia to Kentucky, and west to Kansas. It has been recorded from Ontario, New York, Pennsylvania and Maryland.

Description
The wingspan is about 39 mm. Adults are on wing from May to July.

External links
Image
Moths of Maryland
Butterflies and Moths of North America

Apamea (moth)
Moths of North America
Moths described in 1866
Taxa named by Augustus Radcliffe Grote
Taxa named by Coleman Townsend Robinson